Catherine Thomas (or similar) may refer to:

Catherine Thomas, Welsh politician
Katherine Thomas, musician 
Catherine of Palma (1533-1574), Spanish saint

See also
Thomas (surname)